The following railroads operate in the U.S. state of Washington.

Common freight carriers
Ballard Terminal Railroad (BDTL)
BNSF Railway (BNSF)
 Cascade & Columbia River Railroad (CSCD) (GWRR)
Central Washington Railroad (CWRR) (CBRW)
Columbia Basin Railroad (CBRW)
Columbia and Cowlitz Railway (CLC) (PATR)
Columbia Walla Walla Railroad (CWW) (FTRX)
Eastside Freight Railroad (EFRX) (BDTL)
Frontier Rail (FTRX)
Great Northwest Railroad (GRNW) (WATX)
Kennewick Terminal Railroad (KET) (FTRX)
Kettle Falls International Railway (KFR)
Meeker Southern Railroad (MSN) (BDTL)
Montana Rail Link (MRL)
 Mount Vernon Terminal Railway (MVT)
Olympia and Belmore Railroad (OYLO) (GWRR)
Palouse River and Coulee City Railroad (PCC) (WATX)
Patriot Woods Railroad (PAWR) (PATR)
Pend Oreille Valley Railroad (POVA)
Portland Vancouver Junction Railroad (PVJR) operates Lewis and Clark Railway (LINC)
Puget Sound and Pacific Railroad (PSAP) (GWRR)
Rainier Rail (RANR) (FTRX)
 St. Paul & Pacific Northwest Railroad (STPP))
Tri-City Railroad (TCRY)
Tacoma Rail (TMBL, TRMW)
Union Pacific Railroad (UP)
Washington Eastern Railroad (WER)
Washington and Idaho Railway  (WIR) (MWPX)
Washington Royal Line (WRL) (FTRX)

Private freight carriers
Greenbrier Rail Services
Longview Switching
United States Army (USAX)

Passenger carriers

Amtrak (AMTK)
Battle Ground, Yacolt and Chelatchie Prairie Railroad Association
Chehalis–Centralia Railroad
Chelatchie Prairie Railroad
Lake Whatcom Railway
Mount Rainier Railroad and Logging Museum
Northwest Railway Museum
Sound Transit (Sounder, Tacoma Link, and Central Link)
Yakima Electric Railway Museum
Yakima Valley Rail and Steam Museum Association
Yakima Valley Transportation (YVT)
Seattle Streetcar

Defunct railroads

Electric
Aberdeen Electric Company
Arlington Heights Motor Railway
City Park Railway
Coeur d'Alene and Spokane Railway
Everett Railway and Electric Company
Everett Railway, Light and Water Company
Grays Harbor Railway and Light Company
Grays Harbor Electric Company
Inland Empire Railroad
Loyal Railway
North Shore Electric Company
Olympia Light and Power Company
Pacific Northwest Traction Company
Pacific Traction Company
Puget Sound Electric Railway
Puget Sound International Railway and Power Company
Puget Sound Traction, Light and Power Company
Ross Park Street Railway
Seattle Electric Company
Seattle Municipal Railway
Seattle and Rainier Beach Railway
Seattle and Renton Railway
Seattle, Renton and Southern Railway
South Bend Electric Company
Spokane Cable Railway
Spokane, Coeur d'Alene and Palouse Railway
Spokane and Eastern Railway and Power Company
Spokane Electric Railway
Spokane and Inland Railway
Spokane and Inland Empire Railroad
Spokane Street Railway
Spokane Traction Company
Tacoma Railway and Motor Company
Tacoma Railway and Power Company
Tacoma Railways
Tacoma Traction Company
Twin City Electric Company
Twin City Light and Traction Company
Vancouver Traction Company
Walla Walla Valley Railway (WWV)
Walla Walla Valley Traction Company
Washington–Oregon Corporation
Washington Water Power Company
Whatcom County Railway and Light Company
Willapa Electric Company
Willapa Harbor Railway
Yakima Valley Transportation Company (YVT)

Notes

References
Washington State Department of Transportation (September 2008), Washington State Rail System Map (PDF).  Retrieved May 3, 2008.
Washington State Department of Transportation (2004), Railroads in Washington State.  Retrieved May 6, 2005.
Watco Companies, Railroads.  Retrieved August 15, 2005.

External links
 provides finding aid to article subject from the Special Collections, Washington State Historical Society (WSHS)

Washington
 
 
Railroads